Building lifecycle management (BLM) is the adaptation of product lifecycle management (PLM)-like techniques to the design, construction, and management of buildings. Building lifecycle management requires accurate and extensive building information modeling (BIM).

Life-cycle management of the built environment requires a standardized ontology and the integration of disparate competencies, technologies, and processes.

See also
Computerized maintenance management system

Building engineering
Computer-aided design
Property management
Information technology management